Encephalartos humilis is a species of cycad in the former Transvaal Province, South Africa.

Description
It is an acaule cycad, with stem, mostly underground, which does not exceed 50 cm in height and with a diameter of 15-20 cm, sometimes with secondary stems originating from basal shoots. 
The leaves, pinnate, from 5 to 8, arranged in a crown at the apex of the stem, are 30–50 cm long, supported by a petiole about 10 cm long, and composed of numerous pairs of lanceolate, leathery leaflets, up to 13 long cm, with entire margin and about 9 parallel veins on the lower face, inserted on a greenish-yellow rachis.
It is a dioecious species, with male specimens that have fusiform cones, sessile, 15–20 cm long and 4–5 cm broad, of brownish-gray color, and female specimens with a coarsely cylindrical solitary cone, about 25 cm long and 8–10 cm wide, of the same color as the masculine ones.
The seeds are roughly ovoid, 2.5-3.5 cm long, covered with a light yellow to orange flesh.

References

External links

humilis